The 2016–17 Northern Iowa Panthers men's basketball team represented the University of Northern Iowa during the 2016–17 NCAA Division I men's basketball season. The Panthers, led by eleventh year head coach Ben Jacobson, played their home games at the McLeod Center in Cedar Falls, IA as members of the Missouri Valley Conference. They finished the regular season 14–16, 9–9 in MVC play to finish in a tie for third place. As the No. 3 seed in the MVC tournament, they lost to Missouri State in the quarterfinals.

Previous season 
The Panthers finished 2015–16 season with a record of 23–13, 11–7 in Missouri Valley play to finish in a tie for fourth place. The Panthers defeated Southern Illinois, Wichita State, and Evansville to win the Missouri Valley tournament and earn the conference's automatic bid to the NCAA tournament. As a No. 11 seed, they defeated Texas in the first round to advance to the Second Round where they lost to Texas A&M.

Preseason 
The Panthers were picked to finish in third place in the MVC preseason poll. Jeremy Morgan was selected as preseason Missouri Valley Conference player of the year.

Departures

Incoming transfers

2016 recruiting class

2017 recruiting class

Roster

Schedule and results

|-
!colspan=9 style=| Exhibition

|-
!colspan=9 style=| Non-conference regular season

|-
!colspan=9 style=| Missouri Valley Conference regular season

|-
! colspan="9" style=|  Missouri Valley tournament

Panther Sports Network (PSN) Cedar Falls Utilities Ch. 15/HD415; KCRG-TV Ch. 9.2; WHO-DT Ch. 13.2; KGCW Ch. 26, Time Warner CableKC Channel 324, Comcast SportsNet Chicago

References

Northern Iowa Panthers men's basketball seasons
Northern Iowa
Panth
Panth